"Who's Gonna Mow Your Grass" is a 1969 single written and recorded by Buck Owens. "Who's Gonna Mow Your Grass" was a number one song on the country charts. The single stayed at number one for two weeks and spent a total of fourteen weeks on the country charts.

Content
The song features an example of fuzztone in country music. Its lyrics are about a man who "hopes to regain favor with a fickle sweetheart by reminding her about all the menial chores he willingly performs."

Chart performance

References

1969 singles
Buck Owens songs
Songs written by Buck Owens
Song recordings produced by Ken Nelson (American record producer)
Capitol Records singles
1969 songs